Pseudomelatoma torosa is a species of predatory sea snail, a marine gastropod mollusk in the family Pseudomelatomidae. 

Subspecies 
Pseudomelatoma torosa aurantia Carpenter, 1864

Description
The whorls show an angulated shoulder bearing nodulous terminations of about ten short oblique ribs. There is no spiral sculpture. The color of the shell is burnt-brown, under an olivaceous epidermis. The nodules are whitish. The  aperture is brown. 

The shell of the subspecies P. t. aurantia  is orange-colored, sometimes spirally striate.

Distribution
This marine species occurs off southern California, USA.

References

 Carpenter, Journ. de Conchyl., ser. 3, vol. 12, p. 146, April, 1865.
 Turgeon, D.; Quinn, J.F.; Bogan, A.E.; Coan, E.V.; Hochberg, F.G.; Lyons, W.G.; Mikkelsen, P.M.; Neves, R.J.; Roper, C.F.E.; Rosenberg, G.; Roth, B.; Scheltema, A.; Thompson, F.G.; Vecchione, M.; Williams, J.D. (1998). Common and scientific names of aquatic invertebrates from the United States and Canada: mollusks. 2nd ed. American Fisheries Society Special Publication, 26. American Fisheries Society: Bethesda, MD (USA). . IX, 526 + cd-rom pp. (look up in IMIS)
page(s): 103

External links
 

torosa
Gastropods described in 1864
Taxa named by Philip Pearsall Carpenter